Eccles Interchange is a transport hub in Eccles, Greater Manchester, England. It is composed of a bus station, and a single-platform Metrolink light rail station, the latter of which is the terminus of the system's Eccles Line. It opened on 21 July 2000.

History
The Eccles line for the Metrolink was approved in 1996, with the station being built next to on Regent Street in the town centre, next to existing bus stops in the town centre. The station was opened for service on 21 July 2000, while the station was given the official opening, along with the Eccles line, in January 2001, when the Princess Royal visited the town centre. The new bus station was built next to the existing tram stop and opened in 2001, with additional stops and shelter added adjacent to the station in 2005.

Metrolink services

Service pattern
12 minute service to Ashton-under-Lyne (via MediaCityUK at offpeak times).

Bus services
The majority of services are run by Go North West with the remainder of services run by Arriva North West and Diamond Bus North West.

There are frequent buses running to Manchester, Pendleton, Brookhouse, Irlam, Cadishead, Seedley, Weaste, Salford Royal Hospital, Worsley and the Trafford Centre. Buses also run to Sale, Farnworth, Bolton, Swinton, Winton, Stockport and Warrington.

References

External links
Eccles Stop Information (Metrolink)
Eccles area map (Metrolink)

Tram stops in Salford
Tram stops on the Eccles to Piccadilly line
Bus stations in Greater Manchester
Eccles, Greater Manchester